Kate McCarthy (born 1992) is an Australian rules footballer.

Kate McCarthy may also refer to:

Kate McCarthy (Emmerdale), character on Emmerdale in 2004
Kate McCarthy (director), British director who has worked with Jessica Harris

See also
Katie McCarthy (disambiguation)